The 2019–20 Coppa Italia Serie C was the 48th edition of the Coppa Italia Serie C, the cup competition for Serie C clubs.

Viterbese were the defending champions having won their first title in May 2019 against Monza, but were eliminated by Teramo in the round of 32. Due to the COVID-19 pandemic in Italy, the final – which was originally planned to be played in two legs in April 2020 – was played as a one-off match in June.

Juventus U23 won the competition by defeating Ternana 2–1 in the final, winning their first title.

Participating teams

Group A (20 teams)

 AlbinoLeffe
 Alessandria
 Arezzo
 Carrarese
 Como
 Giana Erminio
 Gozzano
 Juventus U23
 Lecco
 Monza
 Novara
 Olbia
 Pergolettese
 Pianese
 Pistoiese
 Pontedera
 Pro Patria
 Pro Vercelli
 Renate
 Siena

Group B (20 teams)

 Arzignano
 Carpi
 Cesena
 Fano
 Feralpisalò
 Fermana
 Gubbio
 Imolese
 Modena
 Padova
 Piacenza
 Ravenna
 Reggio Audace
 Rimini
 Sambenedettese
 Südtirol
 Triestina
 L.R. Vicenza
 Virtus Verona
 Vis Pesaro

Group C (20 teams)

 Avellino
 Bari
 Bisceglie
 Casertana
 Catania
 Catanzaro
 Cavese
 Monopoli
 Paganese
 Picerno
 Potenza
 Reggina
 Rende
 Rieti
 Sicula Leonzio
 Teramo
 Ternana
 Vibonese
 Virtus Francavilla
 Viterbese

Format and seeding
The 60 teams in the 2019–20 Serie C entered the competition at various stages, as follows:
 Group stage: it was attended by the 31 teams that had not participated in the Coppa Italia. The teams were divided into 11 groups, of which nine consisted of three teams and the other two of two teams. The teams met in one-way matches for the three-team groups, and in home-and-away matches in the two-team groups. The teams ranked first in their respective groups were admitted to the Final round.
 Final round: 40 teams participated, the 29 who also participated in the Coppa Italia and the 11 winners of the preliminary round. The final round was played following a knock-out format, with teams paired based on geography.
 First round (one-legged): played by only 16 of the 40 teams, who faced each other in eight one-legged matches to reduce the number of participants to 32; the home factor was determined by drawing lots.
Round of 32 (one-legged): played by the eight winners of the first round and the 24 who had not played in the first round; 16 one-way matches were played, with the home factor determined by drawing lots.
Round of 16 (one-legged)
 Quarter-finals (one-legged)
 Semi-finals (two-legged)
 Final (one-legged)
With a press release from the Lega Pro, on 10 June, it was decided that the final would be played in a single match and on a neutral field. In the event of a tie at the end of regular time, extra time would be played and, in the event of a further tie, penalty shots. It was also established that the final would be played on 27 June 2020. On 20 June the Stadio Dino Manuzzi of Cesena was chosen to host the final, and it was established that it would take place at 20:45.

The winner of the tournament qualified to the third round of the 2019–20 Serie C promotion play-offs; however, if they satisfied one of the following conditions:

 already promoted to the Serie B by ranking;
 already admitted to the third round of the playoffs by ranking;
 renounced participation in the playoffs;
 finished the Serie C championship in one of the last five places (therefore either relegated directly to Serie D or qualified for the relegation play-out),

their place would be filled by the losing finalist or, alternatively, by the club ranked fourth of the Serie C group to which the cup winner belonged.

Round dates

Group stage

Group A

Group B

Group C

Group D

Group E

Group F

Group G

Group H

Group I

Group L 

Sicula Leonzio won 4–2 on aggregate.

Group M 

Bisceglie won 3–1 on aggregate.

Final stage

Bracket (since round of 32)

First round

Round of 32

Round of 16

Quarter-finals

Semi-finals 

Ternana won 2–0 on aggregate.

Juventus U23 won 4–2 on aggregate.

Final

Notes

References

Coppa Italia Serie C seasons
Coppa Italia Serie C
Italy
Coppa Italia Serie C